The following outline is provided as an overview of and topical guide to Kerala:

Kerala – 21st biggest, 12th most populous, 13th highest and most literate of the 28 states of the democratic Republic of India. Kerala is ranked 9th in the country in tax revenue and GDP. Kerala has the highest life expectancy and female-to-male sex ratio. Kerala is also the most media exposed state.

General reference

Names 
 Common name: Kerala
 Pronunciation: 
 Local name: Keralam
 Official name: State of Kerala
 Nicknames
 God's Own Country
 Adjectivals
 Kerala
 Keralite
 Demonyms
 Keralites
 Malayalis
 Abbreviations and name codes
 ISO 3166-2 code: IN-KL
 Vehicle registration code: KL, series: List of RTO districts in Kerala

Rankings (amongst India's states) 

 by population: 13th
 by area: 22nd
 by gross domestic product (GDP) (2104): 12th
by Human Development Index (HDI): 1st
by life expectancy at birth: 1st
by literacy rate: 1st
List of states and union territories of India by households having electricity: 1st 

Indian states ranking by media exposure: 1st

Geography

 Kerala is: an Indian state, a state of the Republic of India.

Location of Kerala 
 Kerala is situated within the following regions:
 Northern Hemisphere
 Eastern Hemisphere
 Eurasia
 Asia
 South Asia
 Indian subcontinent
 India
 South India
 Time zone: Indian Standard Time (UTC+05:30)

Environment of Kerala 

 Climate of Kerala
 Protected areas of Kerala
 Biosphere reserves in Kerala
 Agasthyamala Biosphere Reserve
 Nilgiri Biosphere Reserve
 National parks of Kerala
 Eravikulam National Park
 Wildlife of Kerala
 Flora of Kerala
 Fauna of Kerala
 Birds of Kerala

Natural geographic features of Kerala 

 Malabar Coast
 Lakes of Kerala
 Kerala Backwaters
 Vembanad Lake
 Hills and mountains of Kerala
 Annamalai Hills
 Nilgiri Hills
 Nelliampathi Mountains
 Islands in Kerala
 Islands of Kollam
 Mountain passes in Kerala
 Palakkad Gap
 Rivers of Kerala

Administrative divisions

Districts

Districts of Kerala 
 Malappuram
 Kozhikode
 Wayanad
 Kannur
 Kasaragod
 Idukki
 Ernakulam
 Thrissur
 Palakkad
 Thiruvananthapuram
 Kollam
 Pathanamthitta
 Alappuzha
 Kottayam

Corporations, municipalities and taluks

Municipal corporations
 Thiruvananthapuram
 Kozhikode
 Kochi
 Kollam
 Thrissur
 Kannur

Municipalities

 Adoor
 Alappuzha
 Aluva
 Angamaly
 Anthoor
 Attingal
 Chalakkudy
 Changanacherry
 Chavakkad
 Chengannur
 Cherpulassery
 Cherthala
 Chittur - Tattamangalam
 Eloor
 Erattupetta
 Ettumanoor
 Feroke
 Guruvayoor
 Harippad
 Irinjalakuda
 Iritty
 Kalamassery
 Kalpetta
 Kanhangad
 Kattappana
 Karunagapally
 Kasaragod
 Kayamkulam
 Kodungallur
 Koduvally
 Kondotty
 Koothattukulam
 Kothamangalam
 Kottakkal
 Kottayam
 Kottarakara
 Koyilandy
 Kunnamkulam
 Kuthuparamba
 Malappuram
 Mananthavadi
 Manjeri
 Mannarkkad
 Maradu
 Mattannur
 Mavelikkara
 Mukkam
 Muvattupuzha
 Nedumangad
 Neyyattinkara
 Nilambur
 Nileshwaram
 North Paravoor
 Ottappalam
 Pala
 Palakkad
 Pandalam
 Panoor
 Paravoor (South)
 Parappanangadi
 Pathanamthitta
 Pattambi
 Payyannur
 Payyoli
 Perinthalmanna
 Perumbavoor
 Piravom
 Ponnani
 Punalur
 Ramanattukara
 Shoranur
 Sreekandapuram
 Sultan Bathery
 Taliparamba
 Tanur
 Thalassery
 Thiruvalla
 Thodupuzha
 Thrikkakara
 Thripunithura
 Tirur
 Tirurangadi
 Vaikom
 Valanchery
 Varkala
 Vatakara
 Wadakkancherry

Taluks

 Adoor
 Alathoor
 Aluva
 Ambalappuzha
 Changanasserry
 Chalakudy
 Chavakkad
 Chenganoor
 Cherthala
 Chittur
 Chirayinkeezhu
 Devikulam
 Eranad
 Hosdurg
 Iritty
 Kanayannur
 Kanjirappally
 Kannur
 Karthikappally
 Karunagappalli
 Kasaragod
 Kochi
 Kodungallor
 Kollam
 Kondotty
 Kothamangalam
 Kottarakkara
 Kottayam
 Koyilandy
 Kozhencherry
 Kozhikode
 Kunnamkulam
 Kunnathur
 Kunnathunad
 Kuttanad
 Mallappally
 Mananthavadi
 Manjeshwaram
 Mannarkkad
 Mavelikkara
 Meenachil
 Mukundapuram
 Muvattupuzha
 Nedumangad
 Neyyattinkara
 Nilambur
 Ottappalam
 Palakkad
 Paravur
 Pathanapuram
 Pattambi
 Payyanur
 Peermade
 Perinthalmanna
 Ponnani
 Ranni
 Sulthan Batheri
 Taliparamba
 Thalappilli
 Thalassery
 Thamarassery
 Thiruvalla
 Thiruvananthapuram
 Thodupuzha
 Thrissur
 Tirur
 Tirurangadi
 Udumbanchola
 Varkala
 Vatakara
 Vaikom
 Vellarikundu
 Vythiri

Demographics
Demographics of KeralaEconomy of KeralaReligions of Kerala
 Tourism
 Education
 colleges and universities

Government and politics of Kerala 

 Government of Kerala
 Form of government: Indian state government
 Capital of Kerala: Thiruvananthapuram
 Elections in Kerala
 Politics of Kerala
 Political families of Kerala
 Political parties in Kerala
 Left Democratic Front
 United Democratic Front
 Politicians
 Communism in Kerala

Branches of the government of Kerala

Executive branch of the government of Kerala 

 Head of state: Governor of Kerala,
 Head of government: Chief Minister of Kerala
 Kerala Council of Ministers
 Departments and agencies

Legislative branch of the government of Kerala 

Kerala Legislative Assembly
 Constituencies of Kerala Legislative Assembly

Judicial branch of the government of Kerala 

 High Court of Kerala

Law and order in Kerala 

Law of Kerala
 Human rights in Kerala
 LGBT rights in Kerala
 Law enforcement in Kerala
 Kerala Police
 Thiruvananthapuram City Police
 Kollam City Police
 Kochi City Police
 Thrissur City Police
 Police Dog Training Centre
 Kerala Thunderbolts
 Malabar Special Police

History of Kerala

History of Kerala, by period

Prehistoric Kerala 

 Edakkal Caves

Ancient Kerala 

 Chera
 Sangam period

Medieval Kerala 

 Kerala school of astronomy and mathematics

Colonial Kerala 

 Battle of Kulachal
 Anglo-Mysore Wars
 Battle of Quilon

Contemporary Kerala 

 Vaikom Satyagraham
 Malabar Migration
 Red rain in Kerala

History of Kerala, by region

Historical regions
 Kingdom of Travancore
 Kingdom of Calicut
 Kingdom of Valluvanad
 Kingdom of Cannanore (Kolathunadu)
 Malabar District
 North Malabar
 South Malabar
 Kingdom of Quilon (Venad)
 Kingdom of Cochin
 Kingdom of Tanur

History of Kerala, by cities 
 History of Trivandrum
 History of Calicut
 History of Cannanore
 History of Cochin
 History of Kasargode
 History of Malappuram
 History of Quilon
 History of Trichur

History of Kerala, by subject 
 Travancore
 Tharavad

Culture of Kerala 

 Architecture of Kerala
 Cuisine of Kerala
 Martial arts in Kerala
 Kalarippayattu
 Media in Kerala
 Monuments in Kerala
 Monuments of National Importance in Kerala
 State Protected Monuments in Kerala
 World Heritage Sites in Kerala

Art in Kerala 

 Kerala mural painting

Cinema of Kerala 

 International Film Festival of Kerala
 Kerala State Film Award

Art forms of Kerala 

 Kathakali
 Kolkali
 Mohiniyattam
 Margamkali
 Ottamthullal
 Theyyam
 Koodiyattam
 Chavittu Nadakam
 Oppana

Literature of Kerala 

 Triumvirate poets of modern Malayalam

Music of Kerala 

 Chenda (Thayambaka)
 Kolkali
 Panchari melam
 Panchavadyam
 Sopanam

Festivals in Kerala 

 Vishu
 Onam
 Pooram
 Temple festivals of Kerala

Language in Kerala 

 Malayalam language
 Malayalam calendar
 Mappila dialect of Malayalam
 Judeo-Malayalam
 Irula language

People of Kerala 

 Malayalis
 Ezhavas
Thiyyas
 Pulayar
 Namboothiris
 Ambalavasis
 Samanthas
 Nairs
 Saint Thomas Christians
 Kerala Iyers
 Nadars
 Cochin Jews
 Dravidians
 Mappilas
 Adivasis
 Scheduled Tribes

Religion in Kerala 

 Hinduism in Kerala
 Christianity in Kerala
 Islam in Kerala
 Jainism in Kerala
 Sarpam Thullal

Sports in Kerala 

 Kerala Cricket Association
 Kerala cricket team
 Kerala Football Association
 Kerala football team
 Vallam Kali (boat race)

Symbols of Kerala 

 State animal: Indian elephant
 State fruit: Jackfruit
 State bird: Great hornbill
 State fish: Karimeen
 State flower: Golden shower
 State seal: Seal of Kerala
 State tree: Coconut

Tourism 

 Alappuzha
 Athirappilly Falls
 Beaches in Kerala
 Estuaries of Paravur
 Kerala Backwaters
 Kollam
 Kovalam
 Kumarakom
 Munnar
 Tourism in Thiruvananthapuram
 Vallamkali
 Wayanad
 Bekal

Economy and infrastructure of Kerala 

 Banking in Kerala
 Cashew Business
 Economic development in Kerala
 Kerala model
 Tourism in Kerala
 Transport in Kerala
 Airports in Kerala
 Rail transport in Kerala
 Roads in Kerala
 Water supply and sanitation in Kerala
 Dams and reservoirs in Kerala

Education in Kerala 

 Institutions of higher education in Kerala

References

External links 

 

 Government
Official entry portal of the Government of Kerala 
Department of Tourism, Government of Kerala
  Directorate of Census Operations of Kerala
 

Kerala geography-related lists
Kerala
Kerala